Mt. Hygeia (also known as the "Solomon Drown House") is an historic farm property at 83 Mt. Hygeia Road in Foster, Rhode Island, United States.

History
Dr. Solomon Drowne, a prominent physician, academic, botanist, and surgeon during the American Revolution, owned the property in the early nineteenth century. Around 1801 Drowne returned to Rhode Island and bought the farm next to Senator Foster and named it Mt. Hygeia after the Greek goddess of health. As near as can be determined, Drown's home was built around 1806 (as determined by Anselyn Lynch researching for the National Register of Historic Places). Drowne used the farm for botanical research and named his driveway the "Appian Way". The farm house was built in 1808 in a Federal style.  One of the oldest Rhode Island Greening trees was located on the property at the turn of the twentieth century.

Application to list the property on the National Register of Historic Places  was filed in 1977. The property was approved and listed August 12, 1977.

See also
National Register of Historic Places listings in Providence County, Rhode Island

References

Houses completed in 1808
Houses on the National Register of Historic Places in Rhode Island
Houses in Providence County, Rhode Island
Foster, Rhode Island
National Register of Historic Places in Providence County, Rhode Island